Alex Éric (born 21 September 1990) is a French Guianaan footballer who currently plays for Matoury in the French Guiana Honor Division and the French Guiana national team.

International career 
Éric made his national team debut for French Guiana on 25 February 2016 in a 2–3 loss against Suriname.

Lauristin scored his first goal and first competitive goal on 7 September 2018, scoring a penalty kick in a 5–0 win against Anguilla, as part of 2019–20 CONCACAF Nations League qualifying.

International goals 
Scores and results list French Guiana's goal tally first.

References 

1990 births
Living people
Association football midfielders
French Guianan footballers
French Guiana international footballers
People from Matoury